The 1926 Rock Island Independents season was their only season in the first American Football League, after jumping to the upstart league from the National Football League. The team finished 2–6 in league play and 2–7–2 overall, earning them seventh place in the league. The Independents struggled to bring in 5000 fans to its home games and later became a traveling team after having poor attendance in its first three games. The AFL folded after the 1926 and the Independents did not rejoin the NFL. They instead played as a minor, semi-pro team in 1927, then folded.

Schedule

League standings

References
Pro Football Archives 1926 Rock Island Independents season

Rock Island Independents seasons
Rock Isl
Rock Isl